Manuel Rendon  (born in San Cristobal, Venezuela, 1987) is an inventor and engineer who created the first U.S. patented formulation for the dynamic disintegration of plastics, the upcycling process for unsorted waste stream and a bio-based copolymer with programmable water solubility. On December 10, 2020, Nestle announced its investment in the company behind this technology.

On plastic-waste regard, pollution is a Global concern given the fact that fossil-based plastic is a substance with a very high molecular weight, This technology creates a homogeneous extremely-soluble copolymer which fully disintegrates within 60 hours of being discarded in the presence of water.

It took Rendon five years and over 1200 experiments to complete his paper. In January 2014, Rendon applied for his first U.S. Patent, once it was approved, he resigned his position at PepsiCo and moved to Miami to launch Timeplast, the company behind this technology. With the partnership of Riverdale Global and Maguire industries they address the problem of plastic pollution, as an alternative for bio-based and so-called biodegradable plastics. Paul Maguire, CEO of Riverdale Global, has presented this technology in the Refocus Sustainability and Recycling Summit, which took place June 27–29, 2017, at the Rosen Shingle Creek Hotel in Orlando, Florida.

In May, 2021, this technology was selected as a finalist in the world's most prestigious sustainable packaging innovation competition 

On December 10, 2020, David Tulauskas, Vice President and Chief Sustainability Officer at Nestlé Waters North America said; “As we make progress toward a zero-waste future, we’re enthusiastic to build on our work by exploring alternative technologies such as those presented by Timeplast."

References

Venezuelan engineers
Living people
1987 births